Drink It Down is a traditional American drinking song found in many variants. The drink varies from stanza to stanza but the common refrain is "Drink it down ! Drink it down !"

In Charles Samuel Elliot's 1870 collection of Yale College songs the refrain goes:
Here's to good old Yale, 
drink it down, drink it down, ...

In the version cited by Jack London in The Strange Experience of a Misogynist the refrain goes: 
"Here's to the good old whiskey, 
For it makes you feel so frisky, 
Drink it down ! Drink it down ! Drink it down !""

Elements of the traditional song were used in "Drink It Down", a 1936 song by Ralph Rainger and Leo Robin, first sung in the film Rhythm on the Range (1936) by Leonid Kinskey and Bing Crosby, accompanied by Bob Burns.

See also
 "Drink It Down", a 2008 Japanese-language song by L'Arc-en-Ciel
 "Drink It Down", a song by Diesel Boy on the 1999 album Sofa King Cool
 "Drink It Down, Lady", a 1980 country song by Rex Allen, Jr.

References

Drinking songs
Year of song unknown
Songwriter unknown